Pugachyov is a town in Saratov Oblast, Russia, located on the Bolshoy Irgiz River (Volga's tributary),  northeast of Saratov, the administrative center of the oblast. Population:

History
It was founded as the sloboda of Mechetnaya in 1764 by Old Believers who returned from Poland. In 1835, it was granted town status and renamed Nikolayevsk, after the Tsar Nicholas I. In 1918, it was renamed after Yemelyan Pugachev, leader of the Cossack insurrection of the 1770s.

Administrative and municipal status
Within the framework of administrative divisions, Pugachyov serves as the administrative center of Pugachyovsky District, even though it is not a part of it. As an administrative division, it is incorporated separately as Pugachyov Town Under Oblast Jurisdiction—an administrative unit with the status equal to that of the districts. As a municipal division, Pugachyov Town Under Oblast Jurisdiction, together with one rural locality (the settlement of Pugachevsky) is Pugachyovsky District, is incorporated within Pugachyovsky Municipal District as Pugachyov Urban Settlement.

Culture
A branch of the Central Archive of the Russian Ministry of Defense is located in the town.

See also
Pugachyov (air base)

References

Notes

Sources

External links
  Unofficial website of Pugachyov

Cities and towns in Saratov Oblast
Nikolayevsky Uyezd (Samara Governorate)